Kitkatla is a small Tsimshian village situated approximately 45 km S.W. of Prince Rupert, British Columbia, Canada, on the north side of Dolphin Island.  The village is accessible via Prince Rupert by regular float plane flights or by boat.  It is home to the Kitkatla group of Tsimshians.

References

Populated places on the British Columbia Coast
Unincorporated settlements in British Columbia
Tsimshian